Orthosia cruda, the small Quaker, is a moth of the family Noctuidae. It is found in Europe, Morocco, Algeria, Tunisia, Turkey, the Caucasus, Transcaucasia, Kazakhstan, Israel, Lebanon, Cyprus and Jordan.

Technical description and variation

The wingspan is 28–32 mm. Forewing grey brown, dusted with dark grey and reddish atoms: inner and outer lines marked by black spots on veins; submarginal line pale, indistinct; upper stigmata dark grey edged with pale and then with rufous; hindwing dull grey. Like Orthosia stabilis, which it resembles in colouration, it varies according to the amount of red shown; — thus pallida Tutt is a very pale grey form without red, but sometimes slightly ochreous-tinged; — pusillus Haw.is a darker grey form without red admixture; — nanus Haw. is like the typical form, reddish grey, but paler; — rufa Tutt is a rarer, reddish form; — lastly, ambigua Hbn. represents a dark red-brown or grey-brown insect with the lines and markings well shown.

Biology
The moth flies in one generation from the end of February to mid-May.

Larva yellowish green, sometimes brown; dorsal and subdorsal lines fine, yellowish white;spiracular line broader and yellower; anal segment with a yellow cross bar; spiracles white with black rings.
The larvae feed on various deciduous trees, such as oak and willow. It lives between leaves spun together.

Notes
The flight season refers to Belgium and the Netherlands. This may vary in other parts of the range.

References

External links

Small Quaker on UKmoths
Funet Taxonomy
Lepiforum.de
Vlindernet.nl 

Orthosia
Moths of Europe
Moths of Africa
Moths of Asia
Moths described in 1775